Gonçalo Alexandre Domingues Agrelos (born 18 February 1998) sometimes known as Salo, is a Portuguese professional footballer who played for Real as a forward.

Football Career
He made his Taça da Liga debut for Belenenses SAD on 3 August 2019 in a game against Santa Clara.

References

External links

1998 births
Footballers from Lisbon
Living people
Portuguese footballers
Association football forwards
Belenenses SAD players
Real S.C. players
Primeira Liga players
Campeonato de Portugal (league) players